Thornhill Secondary School (TSS) is a secondary school in Thornhill, Ontario, Canada. Founded in 1955, the school is administered by the York Region District School Board system.

History
Originally it served as an elementary school, but in 1956 it opened as a full-time high school with 600 students. The TSS library was established in 1960 and renovated in 2007. In 1962, the school increased its classrooms from 30 to 47 and added 32 members to its original faculty of 29.

By 1962, 1090 students were enrolled. A technical and commercial wing was built in 1961. In 1976, the school undertook a major renovation. That same year, the drama program started and the music program expanded. In 1999, an expanded science wing was constructed to accommodate an overflow of students. A new library and school hallway connecting science to the technologies and music was completed in June 2007.

Student life

The Thornhill Secondary School TSS senior boys' basketball team has competed at OFSAA numerous times.  The school's DECA Chapter has historically sent from one to fifteen delegates to DECA's International Career Development Conferences each year, held in major US cities. The school newspaper the Eye of the Tiger is a publication with a reach of nearly 2000 staff, students, and community members.

Sports teams
Sports teams at Thornhill Secondary School include:
Badminton
Baseball
Basketball
Soccer
Ultimate Frisbee
Volleyball
Track and Field
Cross Country
Girls Field Hockey
Golf
Ice Hockey
Skiing
Rowing

Thornhill Secondary School Alumni Association (TSSAA)
Following the school's 50th anniversary in 2004, the Thornhill Secondary School Alumni Association (TSSAA) was established to keep students in touch with each other and with the school and community. The TSSAA holds an annual Half Century Club Luncheon which recognizes students who began at Thornhill fifty years prior. The TSSAA is also active within the school, sponsoring numerous awards for both graduating and non-graduating students.

Notable alumni

Music
 Barbra Lica, jazz singer-songwriter
Dawn Langstroth - singer/songwriter & daughter of Anne Murray and 
John Goadsby aka Goldy McJohn - keyboards, Steppenwolf
Jon Levine - Songwriter/Producer/Performer The Philosopher Kings, Drake.
Martha Johnson (singer) - singer, Martha and the Muffins

Film & Television
Cameron Bailey - artistic director, Toronto International Film Festival
Hayden Christensen - actor, Star Wars: Episode II – Attack of the Clones

Sports
Milos Raonic, tennis player
Stefan Nastić, basketball player

Other
Daniel Dale, former journalist for the Toronto Star, reporter for CNN
Michelle Shephard, journalist for the Toronto Star.
Robert Bateman (artist) - painter

See also
List of high schools in Ontario

References

External links
Official Thornhill Secondary School Website
Thornhill Secondary School Alumni Association Website

York Region District School Board
Educational institutions established in 1955
High schools in the Regional Municipality of York
Buildings and structures in Markham, Ontario
1955 establishments in Ontario